Sigapatella terraenovae is a species of sea snail, a marine gastropod mollusc in the family Calyptraeidae.

Distribution
This species is endemic to New Zealand.

References 

 Powell A. W. B., New Zealand Mollusca, William Collins Publishers Ltd, Auckland, New Zealand 1979 
 Finlay H.J. (1930) Additions to the Recent fauna of New Zealand. No. 3. Transactions and Proceedings of the Royal Society of New Zealand 61: 222-247. [Published 23 August 1930] page(s): 231
 Marshall B.A. 2003. A review of the Recent and Late Cenozoic Calyptraeidae of New Zealand (Mollusca: Gastropoda). The Veliger 46(2): 117-144

External links
 Royal Society of New Zealand
 M.K. Mestayer, A note on Sigapatella terraenovae Peile

Calyptraeidae
Gastropods of New Zealand
Gastropods described in 1924
Taxa named by Alfred James Peile